St. Michael's School is a mixed-gender, ICSE-affiliated school in the heart of the city of Durgapur in West Bengal. It is a unit of St. Michael's group of institutions managed by the Durgapur Society Of Educational Management (DSEM).

See also
List of schools in India
Education in West Bengal

References

Schools in Paschim Bardhaman district
Education in Durgapur, West Bengal
Educational institutions in India with year of establishment missing